The Green Post (German: "Die Grüne Post") was a German newspaper from the Ullstein publishing house. Operations began on 10 April 1927, and the paper enjoyed a quick rise in popularity in all social classes, reaching a circulation of over one million during its first year. Its founder was a future travel writer and journalist Richard Katz. Its editor was Ehm Welk, who would be later known for his work Die Heiden von Kummerow.

In 1934, the Green Post ran an editorial under Welks' assumed alias Thomas Trimm, entitled "A word please, Mr. Reichsminister" in which he criticized Nazi press censorship under Propaganda Minister Joseph Goebbels. The event led to Welk's imprisonment in KZ Oranienburg until public protest saw him released on the condition that he be banned from his profession.

References

Publications established in 1927
Newspapers published in Germany